Into White is the 21st studio album by American singer-songwriter Carly Simon, released by Columbia Records, on January 2, 2007. 

It is her fifth album of standards, following Torch (1981), My Romance (1990), Film Noir (1997), and Moonlight Serenade (2005). The album was produced by the Martha's Vineyard producer Jimmy Parr, with whom Simon has worked extensively as his studio is close to her Tisbury farm. Simon's children, Sally Taylor and Ben Taylor, appear on the album. The three perform a choral trio on the track "You Can Close Your Eyes".

Following the successes of Reflections: Carly Simon's Greatest Hits (2004) and Moonlight Serenade (2005), Into White continued Simon's recently rejuvenated high chart profile and became Billboard's Hot Shot Debut, entering the chart at No. 15 and peaking at No. 13 in its second week, and staying on the charts for 10 weeks. The album also hit No. 1 on the Top Internet Albums chart.

Reception

Into White was met with widespread critical acclaim. PopMatters rated the album 8 out of 10 stars and called it "the first musical gift to grace 2007", praising the track "You Can Close Your Eyes" saying "There’s a shimmering beauty that’s particular to how familial voices intertwine and the union of these three voices is singularly beautiful", and concluded "Ultimately, Into White serves the legacy of Carly Simon very well".

People rated the album 3 out of 4 stars, calling it "a tranquil collection of covers that play like lullabies for grown-ups" and praised the track "You Can Close Your Eyes" calling it "the best moment on the album". In her 2008 book Girls Like Us: Carole King, Joni Mitchell, Carly Simon-And the Journey of a Generation, author Sheila Weller describes this version of "You Can Close Your Eyes" as "slow, spectral" and "achingly beautiful." Entertainment Weekly graded the album B and described it as a "richly personal disc".

AllMusic rated the album 3 out of 5 stars, and concluded the review with "In sum, Into White may be the best record Simon's made since The Bedroom Tapes". The New York Times stated "Entering the world of Carly Simon’s new album is like tiptoeing into an enchanted garden. The fanciful Cat Stevens song that opens the record establishes a mood of deep, dreamy calm that is sustained over 14 songs".

Amazon.com stated "Simon, vocally sure-footed as ever, wicks the warmth out of every last track and directs it with pinpoint precision to her listeners—nobody does music as comfort food better". Barnes & Noble praised Simon's "considerable interpretive skills", writing that she treats these songs "with care and gentle wisdom"; "Billed as 'soothing songs for the young and the young at heart', Into White is quiet and spacious, full of brief songs played softly, with the focus always on Simon's intimate alto. Familial and familiar, Into White impresses with understatement".

Track listing
Credits adapted from the album's liner notes.

Alternate versions 
 A special copy of the album was released by Barnes & Noble with a bonus track, "Hush Little Baby/My Bonnie".

Credits

Musicians

Production

Charts
Album – Billboard (United States)

References

External links
 Carly Simon's Official Website
Into White Official web page

2007 albums
Carly Simon albums
Columbia Records albums